The Thorvald Bindesbøll Medal is an award granted annually by the Royal Danish Academy of Fine Arts for excellence in the fields of applied art and industrial design. The medal was established in 1979 in connection with the 75th anniversary of Thorvald Bindesbøll's design of the Carlsberg Pilsner label. Designed by Frode B. Bahnsen on the basis of a model by Paul Gernes, it has been awarded since 1981.

Recipients

1980s

1990s

2000s

2010s

See also 

List of European art awards

References

Danish art awards
Royal Danish Academy of Fine Arts
Awards established in 1979